Live at the Showbox is the third DVD release by the American alternative rock band Pearl Jam, and the first DVD of a complete show. It was released on May 7, 2003.

Overview
It was recorded on December 6, 2002 at The Showbox in the band's hometown of Seattle, Washington. The show was the second of four warm-up gigs for the band's 2003 Riot Act Tour. The DVD is only available through the band's official website. The particular performance of "Daughter" at this show was notable for Vedder's animated and profanity-laced tag of Edwin Starr's "War", ending in Vedder throwing his mic stand.

Track listing
"Elderly Woman Behind the Counter in a Small Town"
"Off He Goes"
"Thumbing My Way"
"Thin Air"
"Breakerfall"
"Green Disease"
"Corduroy"
"Save You"
"Ghost"
"Cropduster"
"I Am Mine"
"Love Boat Captain"
"Gods' Dice"
"1/2 Full"
"Daughter"/"War"
"You Are"
"Rearviewmirror"
"Bu$hleaguer"
"Insignificance"
"Better Man"
"Do the Evolution"
"Yellow Ledbetter"
"Soon Forget"
"Don't Believe in Christmas"

Personnel

Pearl Jam
Jeff Ament – bass guitar
Matt Cameron – drums
Stone Gossard – guitar
Mike McCready – guitar
Eddie Vedder – vocals, guitar

Additional musicians and production
Ed Brooks at RFI CD Mastering – mastering
Liz Burns, Kevin Shuss – filming
John Burton – recording
Brett Eliason – mixing
Boom Gaspar – Hammond B3, Fender Rhodes
Steve Gordon – filming, editing
Brad Klausen – design and layout

External links
Live at the Showbox information at pearljam.com

2003 video albums
Pearl Jam video albums
Live video albums
Pearl Jam live albums
2003 live albums
Self-released albums